Lunania dodecandra is a species of flowering plant in the family Salicaceae. It is endemic to Cuba.

References

Flora of Cuba
dodecandra
Endangered plants
Taxonomy articles created by Polbot